Salmon ( Śalmōn) or Salmah (שַׂלְמָה Śalmā) is a person mentioned in genealogies in both the Hebrew Scriptures (Old Testament) and in the New Testament.

He was the son of Nahshon, married "Rachab" of Matthew 1:5 (possibly Rahab, of Jericho), and Boaz (or Booz) was their son. Thus, according to the biblical genealogies, Salmon is the patrilineal great-great-grandfather of David. Salmon is mentioned in 1 Chronicles, the Book of Ruth, Matthew 1:4-5, and Luke 3:32. Nahshon was one of the Israelite leaders present with Moses during the exodus from Egypt who undertook a "census of all the congregation of the children of Israel" and therefore Salmon would probably have been a contemporary of Joshua and part of the generation of Israelites who entered the promised land.

Rahab's marriage to Salmon is not mentioned in the account of her hiding Joshua's messengers sent out to spy out Jericho, although the narrative regarding her role concludes that "she dwells in Israel to this day".

See also
 Genealogies of Genesis
 Calmet's Dictionary of the Holy Bible, 1832

References

Tribe of Judah
Gospel of Matthew
Books of Chronicles people
Book of Ruth
Gospel of Luke